The 29th Arizona State Legislature, consisting of the Arizona State Senate and the Arizona House of Representatives, was constituted in Phoenix from January 1, 1969, to December 31, 1970, during Jack Williams' second term as Governor of Arizona. The number of senators remained constant at 30, and the members of the house of representatives also held steady at 60. The Republicans picked up a single seat in the Senate, giving them a 17–13 edge in the upper house, and the Republicans also gained one seat in the lower house, increasing their margin to 34–26.

Sessions
The Legislature met for two regular sessions at the State Capitol in Phoenix. The first opened on January 13, 1969, and adjourned on April 11; while the second convened on January 12, 1970, and adjourned on May 12. There was a single Special Session, which convened on January 5, 1970, and adjourned sine die on January 19.

State Senate

Members

The asterisk (*) denotes members of the previous Legislature who continued in office as members of this Legislature.

The ** denotes that O'Connor was appointed t replace Burgess when Burgess left to take a position in the Richard M. Nixon administration.

House of Representatives

Members 
The asterisk (*) denotes members of the previous Legislature who continued in office as members of this Legislature.

References

Arizona legislative sessions
1969 in Arizona
1970 in Arizona
1969 U.S. legislative sessions
1970 U.S. legislative sessions